"One More Little Kissie" (also credited as "One More Little Kissy") is the eleventh single by the Dutch girl group Luv', released in May 1980 by CNR/Carrere Records. This song appears on the 1980 reissue of the True Luv' album and the Forever Yours LP. It was the last single featuring Patty Brard who left Luv' a couple of months after its release.

Background
Even if Ooh, Yes I Do and Ann-Maria were successful, their sales didn't reach those of You're the Greatest Lover and Trojan Horse. Luv' recorded a pop track containing exotica and bubblegum pop elements: One More Little Kissy, hoping to have bigger success. However, this song did not achieve the desired results. Moreover, due to intern conflicts, Patty Brard decided to leave Luv' in August 1980 as the group was promoting the single. Because the pop act had legal obligations all over the world with its limited company (Interluv'), a new member had to be found. A model and limbo dancer, Ria Thielsch, was chosen to replace Patty.

Commercial performance
"One More Little Kissie" was a Dutch Top 10 hit and reached the Top 20 in Flanders (Belgium). It was a minor chart entry in Germany.

Charts

Weekly charts

Year-end charts

References

1980 singles
Luv' songs
Songs written by Hans van Hemert
Songs written by Piet Souer
1980 songs
Carrere Records singles